George Noble Jones (1811–1876) was a wealthy American southern plantation owner who owned the El Destino Plantation and Chemonie Plantation. In 1839 he hired English architect Richard Upjohn to build Kingscote, one of the earliest summer "cottages" on 253 Bellevue Avenue in Newport, Rhode Island. Kingscote, a classic Gothic Revival building, is now a National Historic Landmark and was added to the National Register of Historic Places in 1973.

George Noble Jones was born in 1811 to Noble Wimberley Jones (1784-1818) and Sarah (Fenwick Campbell) Jones (1784-1843), families with a long colonial heritage. His ancestor, Noble Jones, established Wormsloe Plantation near Savannah, Georgia. On May 18, 1840, George Noble Jones married Mary Wallace Savage (Nuttall) (1812-1869) and purchased Chemonie as well as the Nuttall's El Destino Plantation. G. N. Jones was one of the first members of the elite gentlemen's club, the Newport Reading Room. George Noble Jones died in 1876 in Jefferson, FL. Florida plantation records from the papers of George Noble Jones. St. Louis Mo.: Missouri Historical Society, 1927.</ref>.

References

American planters
1811 births
1876 deaths